Centaurs is a 1978 political drama film directed by Vytautas Žalakevičius. The was the final part of the "Latin American trilogy" (The Whole Truth about Columbus, That Sweet Word: Liberty!).

Plot
The action takes place in an unnamed state in Latin America (implied to be Chile). In the military circles a conspiracy is forming, fired up by foreign special services. The action, codenamed "Centaur", is conceived in Washington. The people believe in the president, but the conspirators, headed by General Pin, are gaining strength to organize a coup.

Cast
Donatas Banionis – President (voiced by Igor Kvasha)
Regimantas Adomaitis – Orlando, director of the Bureau of Investigations (voiced by Vyacheslav Shalevich)
Margit Lukács– president's wife
Yevgeni Lebedev – General Pin
Gyula Benkő– General Catalan
Elena Ivochkina – Anna Maria
Irén Sütő– mother of Anna Maria
Gennadi Bortnikov – Anibal
Itka Zelenogorskaya – Julie
Valentin Gaft – Andres, conspirator
Ion Ungureanu – Minister of Toroa
Mihai Volontir – Evaristo
Bruno O'Ya – Nilsson, Swedish Journalist
Valery Anisimov – Captain Grets
Kakhi Kavsadze – Ugo, the barman
Valery Kuzin – General
Nodar Mgaloblishvili – Minister Miguel
Juozas Budraitis – Raymond
Dumitru Fusu

References

External links

1970s political drama films
Mosfilm films
Czechoslovak drama films
Soviet drama films
Hungarian drama films
1978 films
1970s Russian-language films
1978 drama films